North Carolina's delegation remained unchanged after the census, at thirteen seats. North Carolina elected its members August 14, 1823, after the term began but before the new Congress convened.

See also 
 1822 and 1823 United States House of Representatives elections
 List of United States representatives from North Carolina

Notes 

1823
North Carolina
United States House of Representatives